Hibbertia rufociliata is a species of flowering plant in the family Dilleniaceae and is endemic to a restricted area of north Queensland. It is a shrub with hairy foliage, elliptic to lance-shaped leaves with the narrower end towards the base, and yellow flowers usually arranged singly in leaf axils with 36 to 44 stamens arranged in bundles around two densely scaly carpels.

Description
The lower surface of the leaves is densely hairy. Flowering occurs from April to July.

Taxonomy
Hibbertia rufociliata was first formally described in 2010 by Hellmut R. Toelken in the Journal of the Adelaide Botanic Gardens from specimens collected by Leonard John Brass near Browns Creek, a tributary of the Pascoe River, in 1948. The specific epithet (rufociliata) refers to the rufous hairs characteristic of this species.

Distribution and habitat
This hibbertia grows on sandy ridges in forest in a few locations on Cape York Peninsula in far northern Queensland.

Conservation status
Hibbertia rufociliata is classified as of "least concern" under the Queensland Government Nature Conservation Act 1992.

See also
List of Hibbertia species

References

rufociliata
Flora of Queensland
Plants described in 2010
Taxa named by Hellmut R. Toelken